Myron M. Levoy (January 30, 1930 – December 30, 2019) was an American author of children's and young adults literature. After graduating from Purdue University he worked as a chemical engineer and was involved in the field of space engineering before becoming a full-time author.

Early life 
Myron Levoy was born January 30, 1930. He grew up in the borough of Queens, New York City. His mother, Elsie Schwartz, was Hungarian, and his father, Bernard Levoy was a Jewish immigrant from Hanover. He grew up on 97th Street in Queens with his mother, father, and his older brother, Louis.

Levoy's exposure to the world of literature began early in his childhood. Writing about his youth, he talked about frequently being taken to the local library with his family, and strongly recalled the "smell and feel of books". While at junior high school, Levoy also took part in a choral speaking class, which made him realize that "words alone, without music, can sing" and further kindled his love of writing.

He would later go on to study engineering first at City College of New York and then at Purdue University.

Career 
After graduating from Purdue University with an M.Sc., Levoy started working as a chemical engineer and was also involved in the field of space engineering before becoming a full-time author.

During his aeronautical career, Levoy worked on various projects and ended up with Reaction Motor Division's nuclear technology group, where his most notable work involved research on concepts for a crewed space mission to Mars. In conjunction with that subject, he also authored a paper for the American Institute of Aeronautics and Astronautics on hybrid electrical-nuclear engines.

Levoy began writing his first own stories while still at elementary school. He continued writing small stories and poems during high school, and also became the editor of the poetry column of his school's student newspaper. Even though he initially pursued a technical career in engineering, he also continued his writing, with various poems and short stories being published in a number of literary magazines. His early work also included a number of plays which were produced on stage in New York at that time. His first full-length novel, as well as his only novel for adults, A Necktie in Greenwich Village, was published in 1968.

His move into full-time writing came about a few years later after he started writing short stories for his two children, which were then expanded and collected into his first book for children, The Witch of Fourth Street (and Other Stories), which tells the tales of immigrant neighborhoods of New York during the 1920s, paralleling Levoy's own childhood growing up as a second-generation immigrant. Due to the success of that book, he retired from engineering and concentrated on writing mainly books for children and young adults.

His young adults novels, in which outsiders and otherwise socially marginalized characters were often at the center of the plot, are not only directed against prejudice and racism, but also describe the challenges of finding one's identity and standing up for oneself. A multicultural context also often underlies his books, extending to his stories for children, too, which e.g. variously deal with the issues faced by immigrants, or the particularities of Jewish culture.

Levoy was actively involved in the American peace movement and also participated with his family in the anti-nuclear protests during the Cold War, in New York City in June 1982. He published poetry, plays, a novel, several short stories for children, a picture book, and six books for young adults. At the respective time of their publication, all of his children's stories and young adult novels received largely favorable reviews, including by The New York Times Book Review and The Horn Book Magazine.

Awards and honors 
 Book World's Children's Spring Book Festival honor book 1972 for The Witch of Fourth Street
 Finalist of Jane Addams Children's Book Award 1978 for Alan and Naomi
 Boston Globe–Horn Book Award 1978 honor list for Alan and Naomi
 Finalist at the National Book Award 1980 for Alan and Naomi
 Zilveren Griffel 1981 for Alan and Naomi
 Buxtehuder Bulle 1981 for Alan and Naomi
 Österreichischer Staatspreis für Kinder- und Jugendliteratur 1981 for Alan and Naomi
 Deutscher Jugendliteraturpreis 1982 for Alan and Naomi
 Preis der Leseratten 1982 for Alan and Naomi

Legacy 
Levoy's most successful book, Alan and Naomi, was adapted into a film of the same name, a play and was translated into ten languages. His children's and young adults literature works were especially popular in Germany, where Alan and Naomi received several prizes and was frequently taught in schools up until at least the 2010s; all but one of his books following Alan and Naomi were translated into German, making it the language with the largest count of Levoy's translated works.

In 2013, it was announced that American actor Johnny Depp was considering pursuing the creation of a film based on Levoy's book The Magic Hat of Mortimer Wintergreen, with a script being proposed by English screenwriter Jack Thorne. As of January 2023, no further details or updates have been revealed. It is not clear if any project is still in consideration.

Personal life
In 1952, Levoy married Beatrice (née) Fleicher, with whom he would have two children. The family lived in Rockaway, New Jersey.

Bibliography 
 1968: A Necktie in Greenwich Village
 1971: The Witch of Fourth Street and Other Stories
 1972: Penny Tunes and Princesses (with illustrations by Ezra Jack Keats)
 1977: Alan and Naomi
 1981: A Shadow Like a Leopard
 1984: Three Friends
 1984: The Hanukkah of Great-Uncle Otto
 1986: Pictures of Adam
 1988: The Magic Hat of Mortimer Wintergreen
 1992: Kelly 'n' me
 2000: The Year of Nelly Bates (only published in a German translation as Eine Liebe in Schwarz-Weiß)

References

External links 
 Myron Levoy – HarperCollins
 Myron Levoy – National Book Foundation
 

1930 births
2019 deaths
20th-century American male writers
20th-century American novelists
American male novelists
American children's writers
Writers of young adult literature
Writers from Queens, New York
American people of Hungarian descent
American people of German-Jewish descent
City College of New York alumni
Purdue University College of Engineering alumni
American aerospace engineers